This is a list of people executed in the United States in 2020. A total of seventeen people, all male, were executed in the United States in 2020, sixteen by lethal injection and one by electrocution. The federal government of the United States executed ten people in 2020, ending a hiatus on federal executions which had lasted for over 17 years. State executions dropped significantly in 2020 compared to previous years, primarily due to the COVID-19 pandemic in the United States.

List of people executed in the United States in 2020

Demographics

Executions in recent years

COVID-19-related problems with scheduling executions
Due to the COVID-19 pandemic, a number of executions that had been planned for 2020 were postponed and/or rescheduled. Texas postponed the executions of seven inmates who were due to be executed between March and September, beginning with Carlos Trevino, whose execution was postponed three times (first on March 11, then June 3, and finally September 30). Tennessee also postponed the executions of four inmates who were due to be executed between June and December. In addition, the December 8 execution of Lisa Montgomery by the federal government was postponed by the DC District Court after both of her defense attorneys caught COVID-19. She was executed the following year, on January 13, 2021.

See also
 List of death row inmates in the United States
 List of juveniles executed in the United States since 1976
 List of most recent executions by jurisdiction
 List of people executed by the United States federal government
 List of people executed in Texas, 2020–present
 List of people scheduled to be executed in the United States
 List of women executed in the United States since 1976

References

List of people executed in the United States
Executions
People executed in the United States
2020
Male murderers